Suffield High School is located in West Suffield, Connecticut, a town in Hartford County that abuts the Massachusetts border.

History
The first Suffield High School building was constructed in 1939. It saw its first graduating class in 1940. A wing was added in 1956 to accommodate student growth and additional construction was done in 1961. That building is now known as McAlister Intermediate School.

The school's second building was constructed in 1965 and served through 2002, which is currently in use as Suffield Middle School. The third, and current, building, opened in fall 2002, and is located at 1060 Sheldon Street, West Suffield, Connecticut.

Extracurricular activities

Suffield High School participates in the North Central Connecticut Conference, and supports many varsity sports. Boys' athletics include baseball, basketball, cross country, football (shared with Windsor Locks and East Granby), golf, ice hockey (shared with Windsor Locks and Granby), indoor track, lacrosse (shared with Windsor Locks), outdoor track, soccer, swimming (shared with Ellington), tennis and wrestling. Girls' athletics include basketball, cheerleading (with Windsor Locks), cross country, dance team, field hockey, golf, indoor track, lacrosse, outdoor track, soccer, softball, swimming, tennis and volleyball.

Agriculture program
Suffield High School has one of the largest agricultural education departments in the region.  Enrollment for this program is competitive as it provides a unique experience at an academically competitive high school. This program, which acts as a regional magnet school, services students from surrounding towns such as Windsor Locks, Enfield, Canton, and several other towns in Hartford County.  Enrolled students attend required curricular courses as well agricultural education courses over their four year high school career.

References

External links
 

Educational institutions established in 1939
Schools in Hartford County, Connecticut
Suffield, Connecticut
Public high schools in Connecticut
Magnet schools in Connecticut
1939 establishments in Connecticut